Othon José de Almeida Bastos (born 23 May 1933) is a Brazilian actor. He has appeared in 50 films since 1962.

Filmography

References

External links

1933 births
Living people
Brazilian male film actors
People from Bahia
20th-century Brazilian male actors
21st-century Brazilian male actors